Abrams is a surname related to Abrahams, Abram, Abrahm and Abraham. It developed independently in the Jewish diaspora, England, Germany and the Netherlands. The name and its variants have been found in England since the medieval era in the Domesday Book and Hundred Rolls. , it is most commonly found in the United States. Notable people with the surname include:

 A. J. Abrams (born 1986), American basketball player
 Albert Abrams (1863–1924), American physician
 Aruna Abrams (born 1975), American singer
 Austin Abrams (born 1996), American actor
 Cal Abrams (1924–1997), American baseball player
 Carol Ann Abrams (1942–2012), American television and film producer
 Charles Abrams (1901–1970), Polish-American lawyer
 CJ Abrams (born 2000), American baseball player
 Creighton Williams Abrams (1914–1974), American army officer
 Dan Abrams (born 1966), American television talk show host
 Delrick Abrams (born 1997), American football player
 Elliott Abrams (born 1948), American foreign policy official
 Elliot Abrams (meteorologist) (born 1947), American meteorologist
 Floyd Abrams (born 1936), American attorney
 Geoff Abrams (born 1978), American tennis player
 Gerald W. Abrams (born 1939), American television producer
 Gracie Abrams (born 1999), American singer-songwriter
 Harry N. Abrams, American book publisher
 Herbert Abrams (1921–2003), American painter
 Herbert L. Abrams (1920–2006), American doctor
 J. J. Abrams (born 1966), American producer
 John Abrams (field hockey) (born 1934), New Zealand field hockey player
 John N. Abrams (1946–2018), American army officer
 Kevin Abrams (disambiguation), multiple people
 LeRoy Abrams (1874–1956), American botanist
 Link Abrams (born 1973), American-New Zealand basketball player
 Mark Abrams (1906–1994), English social scientist
 Melville E. Abrams (1912–1966), New York politician
 M. H. Abrams (1912–2015), American literary critic
 Mike Abrams (psychologist) (1953-), American Psychologist and author
 Morris Abrams (1908–1981), American inventor
 Richard Abrams (disambiguation), multiple people
 Robert Abrams (born 1938), American politician
 Robert B. Abrams (born 1960), American general
 Roz Abrams (born 1948), American television journalist
 Ruth Abrams (1930–2019), American judge
 Sam Abrams (born 1935), American poet
 Stacey Abrams (born 1973), American politician
 Stephen Abrams (1938–2012), American scholar and activist
 Steve Abrams (born 1949), American politician
 William Abrams (1785–1844), English businessman
 W. J. Abrams (1829–1900), American businessman and politician

References

See also
Abrams (disambiguation)
Abram (name)

English-language surnames
Jewish surnames
Patronymic surnames